Localized hypertrichosis may refer to:

 Localized acquired hypertrichosis
 Localized congenital hypertrichosis

See also:

 Hypertrichosis

Conditions of the skin appendages